Nagtipunan, officially the Municipality of Nagtipunan, is a 1st class municipality in the province of Quirino, Philippines. According to the 2020 census, it has a population of 25,399 people. Nagtipunan is the largest town in terms of land area in Quirino and the entire Luzon island.

The municipality is known for its natural environment, and is dubbed as the tourism capital of the province of Quirino.

Etymology
The town's name was derived from the native word nagtipunan meaning “convergence point,” in reference to several major tributaries of the Cagayan River in Aurora, Nueva Vizcaya and Qurino meeting at points within this area.

History
The Municipality of Nagtipunan was formerly a part of Maddela. It was created on February 25, 1983, by virtue of Batas Pambansa No. 345 and approved in a plebiscite held on September 24, 1983.

Geography
As the second largest municipality in the Philippines, it occupies a land area of 1,607.40 square kilometers, nearly half of the province itself.

Barangays
Nagtipunan is politically subdivided into 16 barangays. These barangays are headed by elected officials: Barangay Captain, Barangay Council, whose members are called Barangay Councilors. All are elected every three years.

Climate

Demographics

Economy

Tourism
Natural attractions include:

 The Cagayan River, one of the cleanest bodies of water in the Philippines, which flows from Barangay San Pugo down to Barangay Ponggo where Tatimbang, Apang, Aguk, Bimmapor and Puctad are found.
It used for swimming and picnicking.
 Also found in Nagtipunan is the “Bimmapor,” a rock formation similar to a sunken ship, of which only the upper decks are protruding from the ground.
 The Pusuac cave and watershed in Barangay Ponggo.

Government
Nagtipunan, belonging to the lone congressional district of the province of Quirino, is governed by a mayor designated as its local chief executive and by a municipal council as its legislative body in accordance with the Local Government Code. The mayor, vice mayor, and the councilors are elected directly by the people through an election which is being held every three years.

Elected officials

Education
The Schools Division of Quirino governs the town's public education system. The division office is a field office of the DepEd in Cagayan Valley region. The office governs the public and private elementary and public and private high schools throughout the municipality.

References

External links
Nagtipunan Profile at PhilAtlas.com
[ Philippine Standard Geographic Code]
Philippine Census Information
Local Governance Performance Management System

Municipalities of Quirino